Hatice Muazzez Sultan ("respecful lady" and "precious", died 12 September 1687) was the third Haseki Sultan of Sultan Ibrahim and the mother of Sultan Ahmed II.

Life 
Muazzez entered in Ibrahim's harem in 1640, and gave birth to her only certain son, Şehzade Ahmed (future Ahmed II) on 25 February 1643. She was the third Haseki Sultan. During Ibrahim's reign, she received a stipend of 1000 aspers a day. She was the most beautiful of all Ibrahim's concubine and she was known for her mild character and her good manners in the palace.

After the deposition and death of Sultan Ibrahim in 1648, his eldest son, Sultan Mehmed IV, son of Turhan Sultan, ascended the throne, after which Muazzez settled in the Old Palace. This brought her thirty eight years of imprisonment in the Old Palace and separation from her son, who was closed in the Kafes.

Death and aftermath
In 1687, a large fire broke out near the Old Palace. By the next evening the fire had engulfed the Old Palace. The fire burned for five hours and the palace burned down in many places. Most of lives of people in the Old Palace were saved by the servants in the palace. Muazzez was so burned from the fire that she died the next day. Her body was taken to Üsküdar, and was buried near a palace around there. Thus, she was not Valide sultan to her son because she died four years before Ahmed II's accession to the throne.

Wares belonging to Muazzez, were immediately placed in the imperial treasury. Her Jewelry was given to Behzad Kadın, Süğlün Kadın, and Șehsuvar Kadın, consorts of the new Sultan Suleiman II. But when her son ascended the throne in 1691, he took away the jewelry from the consorts of the recently deceased Sultan, and placed the jewelry in the imperial treasury.

Issue
Together with Ibrahim, Muazzez had only a certain son:
 Ahmed II (Topkapı Palace, 25 February 1643 - Edirne, Turkey, 6 February 1695, buried in Süleymaniye Mosque). Sultan of the Ottoman Empire. 
It is not known for sure if she had other children, but according to some she is also the mother of: 

Gevherhan Sultan (Constantinople, 1642 - October 27, 1694). She was close to Rabia Sultan, wife of Ahmed II, and donated some of her properties and income to their newborn daughter, Asiye Sultan.

In popular culture
In the 2015 Turkish historical non-fiction TV series Muhteşem Yüzyıl: Kösem, Muazzez Sultan is portrayed by Turkish actress Firuze Gamze Aksu.

See also
Ottoman family tree
Ottoman dynasty
List of consorts of the Ottoman sultans
List of mothers of the Ottoman sultans

Notes

References

Sources

1629 births
1687 deaths
People from the Ottoman Empire of Polish descent
17th-century consorts of Ottoman sultans
1600s births
Mothers of Ottoman sultans